Diane Julie Abbott (born 27 September 1953) is a British politician who has been Member of Parliament (MP) for Hackney North and Stoke Newington since 1987. A member of the Labour Party, she served in the Shadow Cabinet of Jeremy Corbyn as Shadow Home Secretary from 2016 to 2020. Abbott was the first black woman elected to Parliament, and is the longest-serving black MP in the House of Commons.

Born in Paddington, to a British-Jamaican family, Abbott attended Harrow County School for Girls before going to read History at Newnham College, Cambridge. After joining and leaving the Civil Service, she worked as a reporter for Thames Television and TV-am before becoming a press officer for the Greater London Council. Joining the Labour Party, she was elected to Westminster City Council in 1982 and then as an MP in 1987, being returned in every general election since. 

She was a member of the Labour Party Black Sections.
Critical of Tony Blair's New Labour project that pushed the party towards the centre during the 1990s, in the House of Commons Abbott voted against several Blairite policies, including the Iraq War and the Identity Cards Act 2006. She stood for the Labour Party leadership on a left-wing platform in 2010, losing heavily to Ed Miliband, who appointed her Shadow Minister for Health in the Official Opposition frontbench.

A supporter of Jeremy Corbyn's bid to become Labour Leader in 2015, Abbott became Shadow Secretary of State for International Development, then Shadow Health Secretary, and eventually Shadow Home Secretary. As a key Corbyn ally, she supported his leftward push of the Labour Party. She unsuccessfully attempted to be chosen as the Labour candidate for the 2016 London mayoral election, and backed the unsuccessful Britain Stronger in Europe campaign to retain UK membership of the European Union. After the 2019 general election, Abbott was removed from the Shadow Cabinet under Keir Starmer. She remains in the House of Commons, but as a backbencher.

Early life and career
Abbott was born to Jamaican parents in Paddington, London, on 27 September 1953. Her father worked as a welder and her mother as a nurse. Both of her parents left school at the age of 14. She attended Harrow County School for Girls (a grammar school) and then Newnham College, Cambridge, where she read history, achieving a lower second-class degree (2:2). At Cambridge, she was supervised by Sir Simon Schama.

After university, Abbott became an administration trainee (a fast-track route to senior positions in HM Civil Service)  at the Home Office (1976 to 1978), and then a Race Relations Officer at the National Council for Civil Liberties (1978 to 1980). She was a researcher and reporter at Thames Television from 1980 to 1983, and then a researcher at the breakfast television company TV-am from 1983 to 1985. She was a press officer at the Greater London Council under Ken Livingstone from 1985 to 1986, and Head of Press and Public Relations at Lambeth Council from 1986 to 1987.

Political career
Abbott's career in politics began in 1982 when she was elected to Westminster City Council, serving until 1986. In 1983, she was active in the Labour Party Black Sections movement, alongside Bernie Grant, Paul Boateng and Keith Vaz, campaigning for greater African Caribbean and Asian political representation. In 1985, she unsuccessfully fought to be selected in Brent East, losing out to Ken Livingstone. In 1987, Abbott was elected to the House of Commons, replacing the deselected serving Labour MP Ernie Roberts as MP for Hackney North & Stoke Newington. She was the first black woman to become an MP.

Abbott's speech on civil liberties, in the debate on the Counter-Terrorism Bill 2008, won The Spectator magazine's "Parliamentary Speech of the Year" award, and further recognition at the 2008 Human Rights awards. A speech by Abbott in a House of Commons debate on the Caribbean is included in Margaret Busby's 2019 anthology New Daughters of Africa.

Abbott has served on a number of parliamentary committees on social and international issues and held shadow ministerial positions in successive Shadow Cabinets. For most of the 1990s, she also served on the Treasury Select Committee of the House of Commons. She went on to serve on the Foreign Affairs Select Committee. She gave birth to her son in October 1991, one year before the House of Commons introduced a crèche.

Abbott chairs the All-Party Parliamentary British-Caribbean Group and the All-Party Sickle Cell and Thalassemia Group. She is the founder of the London Schools and the Black Child initiative, which aims to raise educational achievement levels amongst black children.

In May 2010, Abbott was returned as MP for the constituency of Hackney North and Stoke Newington, with a doubled majority on an increased turn-out. She was again re-elected in 2015 with 62% of the vote.

At Goldsmiths' College, on 26 October 2012, a jubilee celebration was held to honour Abbott's 25 years in Parliament, with a series of contributions by Linton Kwesi Johnson, Kadija Sesay, Tunday Akintan and others.

2010 leadership election and frontbench role

On 20 May 2010, Abbott announced her intention to stand in the Labour leadership contest. She secured the necessary 33 nominations by 9 June, assisted by the withdrawal of John McDonnell and support from David Miliband and Jack Straw, among others. On Saturday, 25 September 2010, Ed Miliband was announced as the new leader of the Labour Party, Abbott having been eliminated in the first round of voting after securing 7.24% of votes.

Abbott was later appointed Shadow Minister for Public Health by Ed Miliband, taking shadow responsibility for a range of issues including children's health, maternity services, sexual health, tobacco, nursing, obesity and alcohol abuse. Following her move onto the front bench, the Telegraph said on 27 September 2011 that Abbott had "become one of Labour's best front bench performers".

On the issue of abortion, Abbott has become a vocal "pro-choice" supporter, opposing moves towards changing abortion counselling policy, and reducing the abortion time limit. She resigned from a cross-party group on abortion counselling saying it was no more than a front to push forward an anti-abortion agenda without debate in parliament.

In 2011, she voted in favour of military intervention in Libya.

On 5 February 2013, following the Second Reading, Abbott voted in favour of the Marriage (Same Sex Couples) Bill.

Removal from the frontbench and 2015 London mayoral election

On 8 October 2013, Abbott was sacked as Shadow Public Health Minister in a reshuffle by Labour leader Ed Miliband, and replaced by Luciana Berger. On 23 June 2014, Abbott had stated she would consider standing in the 2016 London mayoral election as Mayor of London. On 30 November 2014, Abbott announced her intention to put herself forward to become Labour's candidate at the London mayoral elections in 2016. She was unsuccessful in her bid for Labour's 2015 London mayoral election nomination.

She was one of 16 signatories of an open letter to Ed Miliband in January 2015 calling on the party to commit to oppose further austerity, take rail franchises back into public ownership and strengthen collective bargaining arrangements.

Return to the frontbench
A close ally of Jeremy Corbyn, Abbott was one of 36 Labour MPs to nominate him as a candidate in the Labour leadership election of 2015. Following Corbyn's election as Labour leader, Abbott was appointed to the post of Shadow Secretary of State for International Development.

On 27 June 2016, after the resignations of many of Labour's ministerial team in the aftermath of the Brexit referendum, Abbott was promoted to the position of Shadow Health Secretary.

On 6 October 2016, following  the resignation of Andy Burnham, Abbott was appointed Shadow Home Secretary. She was sworn of the Privy Council on 15 February 2017.

2017 general election

On 2 May 2017, during that year's general election campaign, Labour's pledge to recruit an extra 10,000 police officers was overshadowed by Abbott's inability to give accurate funding figures.  In an interview on LBC Radio with Nick Ferrari, she repeatedly struggled to explain how the promise would be funded.  In the interview, Abbott frequently paused, shuffled her papers and gave out the wrong figures. When asked about her performance, the Labour leader, Jeremy Corbyn, insisted he was not embarrassed by what many pundits called a "car crash" interview.

In a further interview conducted by ITV on 5 May 2017, as the 2017 local elections results were being announced, Abbott was again unable to give accurate figures on the Labour Party's performance suggesting that the party had a net loss of 50 seats. However, her figure was corrected by the interviewer who stated that Labour had in fact lost 125 seats, at which point Abbott said that the last figures she had seen were a net loss of around 100.

Appearing on Andrew Marr's Sunday morning programme for the BBC on 28 May, Abbott's apparent support for the IRA nearly 35 years ago came up, along with some parliamentary votes Marr thought questionable.  These included her advocacy of the abolition of "conspiratorial groups" such as MI5 and Special Branch in the late 1980s, both of which she said had been successfully reformed.  She defended a vote opposing the proscription of a list of groups, including al-Qaida, on the basis that some of the others had the status of dissidents in their country of origin and Abbott would have voted to ban al-Qaida in isolation. According to Sam Coates in The Times, this appearance was arranged without the consent of Labour's campaign team.

On 5 June 2017, during a Sky News interview, Abbott was unable to answer questions about the Harris report on how to protect London from terror attacks.  She insisted that she had read the report, but was unable to recall any of the 127 recommendations.  When asked if she could remember the specific recommendations, Abbott said: "I think it was an important review and we should act on it." Abbott also denied reports that Corbyn and shadow chancellor John McDonnell were attempting to stop her from making broadcasts.  The next day, Abbott withdrew at the last minute – citing illness – from a joint interview on Woman's Hour on 6 June, in which she had been due to face her Conservative frontbench opposite number Amber Rudd.  On 7 June, Corbyn announced that Abbott was "not well" and had stepped aside in her role as Shadow Home Secretary. Lyn Brown was temporarily assigned to replace her. Barry Gardiner said in a radio interview on LBC that Abbott had been diagnosed with having a "long-term" medical condition, and was "coming to terms with that".

In spite of these controversies, Abbott was re-elected in her seat of Hackney North and Stoke Newington, receiving 75% of the constituency's votes with an increased majority of over 35,000.  The following week it became known that Abbott had been diagnosed as suffering from type 2 diabetes in 2015.  "During the election campaign, everything went crazy – and the diabetes was out of control, the blood sugar was out of control", she told The Guardian.  Dealing with six or seven interviews in a row became problematic because she was not eating enough food, which forced a break upon her; however, the condition is back under control. Abbott returned to the role of Shadow Home Secretary on 18 June.

Since 2017 
On 2 October 2019, Abbott became the first black MP at the dispatch box at Prime Minister's Questions.  She served as a temporary stand-in for the Leader of the Opposition, Jeremy Corbyn, while First Secretary of State Dominic Raab stood in for Prime Minister Boris Johnson.

Abbott was a supporter of Speaker of the House of Commons John Bercow, and defended him from bullying allegations made by David Leakey.  She was re-elected at the snap 2019 general election.

On 23 February 2020, Abbott said she would be standing down as Shadow Home Secretary and leaving the frontbench upon the election of a new Labour leader.  She stood down on 5 April and was succeeded by Nick Thomas-Symonds.

In April 2020, she was appointed to the Home Affairs Select Committee.

In May 2021, she wrote in a Guardian article that if Labour was to lose the Batley and Spen by-election, Starmer should resign as Labour leader. She described the local elections as disappointing for Labour. Abbott criticised the shadow cabinet reshuffle later carried out by Keir Starmer. She told Sophy Ridge on Sky News that his demotion of Angela Rayner was "baffling". After the 2022 local elections, Abbott said that Keir Starmer should resign if he is fined by Durham Constabulary over Beergate.

Media work
Until her appointment as a shadow minister in October 2010, Abbott appeared alongside media personality and former Conservative politician Michael Portillo on the BBC's weekly politics digest This Week. Abbott and Portillo have known each other since their schooldays, during which they appeared in joint school productions of Romeo and Juliet (although not in the title roles), and of Macbeth as Lady Macduff and Macduff respectively.

In August 2012, the BBC Trust ruled that payments to Abbott for her appearances on This Week were made in breach of BBC guidelines that banned payments to MPs who were representing their political parties. For her part, Abbott had correctly declared the payments in the Parliamentary Register of Members' Interests. The Trust also said that Abbott had appeared on the show too often.

Abbott is a frequent public speaker, newspaper contributor and TV performer, appearing on programmes including Have I Got News for You, Celebrity Come Dine with Me and Cash in the Celebrity Attic.

Abbott was shortlisted for the Grassroot Diplomat Initiative Award in 2015 for her work on London Schools and the Black Child, and remains in the directory of the Grassroot Diplomat Who's Who publication.

Political positions
Abbott has a record of differing from some party policies, voting against the Iraq War, opposing ID cards and campaigning against the renewal of Britain's Trident nuclear weapons.

Abortion rights
Abbott supported a number of amendments to the Human Fertilisation and Embryology Bill (now Act) that favoured abortion rights (along with Katy Clark MP and John McDonnell MP) – including in 2008 leading on the NC30 Amendment of the Abortion Act 1967: Application to Northern Ireland.  Writing for The Guardian, Abbott argued that

When it comes to the right to choose, women in Northern Ireland are second-class citizens. They are denied the NHS treatment and funding for abortion that is permitted to every other woman in the United Kingdom.

It was reported that the Labour Government at the time (in particular Harriet Harman) asked MPs not to table these pro-abortion amendments (and at least until Third Reading) and then allegedly used parliamentary mechanisms in order to prevent a vote accordingly. Speaking in the debate in Parliament, Abbott criticised these "manoeuvres":

I speak against the programme motion because—and I say this with no pleasure—it and the order of discussion appear to be a shabby manoeuvre by Ministers to stop the full debate of some very important matters. I appreciate that Ministers did not intend this to be a Bill about abortion. I am open to the argument that we should have another piece of legislation that would enable a full debate on most of the matters in relation to abortion that have been raised as amendments and new clauses to the Bill, but there is a special case for debating and voting on the particular new clause that I tabled to extend the 1967 Act to Northern Ireland.

Saudi Arabia
Abbott criticised David Cameron's government for its continued support for Saudi Arabian-led military intervention in Yemen. In March 2016, Abbott wrote: "over the past year alone, Britain has sold around £6bn worth of weapons to Saudi Arabia, whose campaign in Yemen is targeting civilians – 191 such attacks have collectively been reported by the UN, HRW and Amnesty."

European Union
Abbott voted against the Maastricht Treaty.

Abbott campaigned and supported the Labour Party's official preference for the remain campaign in the 2016 United Kingdom European Union membership referendum. In December 2016, she told Andrew Marr that Labour policy was to respect the result of the referendum.

In January 2017, Abbott stated that Labour could oppose the bill to trigger Article 50 if Labour's amendments were rejected. She abstained from voting on the second reading of the Brexit Bill, after becoming ill hours before the vote, and later voted in favour at the third and final reading. She said she did this out of party loyalty and respect for democracy In December 2017, Abbott did not support holding a second referendum, saying in 2018 that the UK would vote to leave again in a hypothetical poll. She supported the holding of one after the 2019 European Parliament elections. She consistently voted against the withdrawal agreement.

Israel and Palestine conflict 
During the 2021 Israel–Palestine crisis, Abbott spoke at a Free Palestine rally in London condemning the Israeli occupation of Palestine.

Windrush scandal
Abbott wrote to Sajid Javid demanding that he publish the figures for people caught up in the Windrush scandal, and also tell how many Commonwealth citizens lost their jobs, became homeless and were prevented from using public services. She wrote that "warm words are not enough", and maintained that transparency was needed to give the Windrush generation confidence ministers have come to grips with what is "clearly a systemic problem at the Home Office. In order to make good on your promise to do right by the Windrush generation and begin to right this historic wrong, you must stop covering up the extent of the Windrush crisis and publish these figures. (...) It is unacceptable and frankly scandalous that the extent of the Windrush crisis is yet to be revealed and that the home secretary is still to publish these figures. As the Windrush scandal shows, the hostile environment inevitably catches our fellow citizens who are legally entitled to be here in its net. The government now needs to stop covering up the true human cost of the hostile environment."

In August 2018, Abbott complained that there were still delays in settling Windrush claims, saying: "From the Windrush scandal to immigration detention, to these outrageous delays – it is long past time that the government takes responsibility for leaving people distressed and destitute."

Comments about Mao Zedong
In 2008, during a BBC One This Week interview between Abbott, Michael Portillo and Andrew Neil about who was history's worst dictator, Abbott said about the Chinese leader Mao Zedong: "I suppose some people will judge that on balance Mao did more good than harm... He led his country from feudalism, he helped to defeat the Japanese and he left his country on the verge of the great economic success they are having now." She finished by saying: "I was just putting the case for Mao."

Political controversies

Education of Abbott's son
Abbott's decision in 2003 to send her son to the private City of London School after criticising colleagues for sending their children to selective schools, which she herself described as "indefensible" and "intellectually incoherent", caused controversy and criticism.

According to the Daily Mirror, she said: "I'd done a lot of work on how black boys underachieve in secondary schools so I knew what a serious problem it was. I knew what could happen to my son if he was sent to the wrong school and got in with the wrong crowd. I realised they were subjected to peer pressure and when that happens it’s very hard for a mother to save her son. Once a black boy is lost to the world of gangs it's very hard to get them back and I was genuinely very fearful of what could happen."

Her son contacted a radio phone-in to say that his mother was following his own wishes: "She's not a hypocrite, she just put what I wanted first instead of what people thought," he told LBC. He added that he had wanted to go private rather than attend a local state school in Abbott's Hackney constituency.

Register of Members' Interests
In 2004, following a complaint made by Conservative MP Andrew Rosindell, Abbott was investigated by the Committee on Standards and Privileges regarding payments she had received from the BBC. The committee found that she had failed to declare in the Register of Members' Interests earnings of £17,300 that she had received for appearances on the television programme This Week. The Committee upheld the complaint and required Abbott to apologise to the House.

Comments on race
In 1996, Abbott was criticised after she claimed that at her local hospital "blonde, blue-eyed Finnish girls" were unsuitable as nurses because they had "never met a black person before". In response, Marc Wadsworth, founder of the Anti-Racist Alliance, whose mother is Finnish, pointed out that the then-current Miss Finland, Lola Odusoga, was Black, of Nigerian and Finnish descent. "She's a black Finn like me," he said. Abbott's position was supported by fellow Labour MP Bernie Grant: "Bringing someone here from Finland who has never seen a black person before and expecting them to have some empathy with black people is nonsense. Scandinavian people don't know black people—they probably don't know how to take their temperature."

In 2010, defending her decision to send her son to a private school, she asserted that "West Indian mums will go to the wall for their children", prompting criticism about this perceived slight on white mothers.

On 4 January 2012, Abbott tweeted that: "White people love playing 'divide and rule'. We should not play their game", which again led to widespread criticism, including accusations of racism. Abbott later apologised for "any offence caused", claiming that she had not intended to "make generalisations about white people"; she claimed in an interview with Andrew Neil that her tweet was referring to the history of the British Empire. The Deputy Prime Minister Nick Clegg called her comments a "stupid and crass generalisation". Nadhim Zahawi, Conservative MP, said: "This is racism. If this was a white member of Parliament saying that all black people want to do bad things to us he would have resigned within the hour or been sacked." Members of the public lodged complaints, but the Metropolitan Police stated that no investigation would be launched, and no charges would be brought against her, saying she "did not commit a criminal offence."

IRA
In May 2017, The Sunday Times reported that Abbott backed the IRA in a 1984 interview with Labour and Ireland, a pro-republican journal. In the 1984 interview, Abbott criticised the Unionist population of Northern Ireland as an "enclave of white supremacist ideology comparable to white settlers in Zimbabwe", and called for their views to be ignored on the question of Unification, adding: "Ireland is our struggle—every defeat of the British state is a victory for all of us. A defeat in Northern Ireland would be a defeat indeed."

In May 2017, while Shadow Home Secretary, she was asked by Andrew Marr whether she regretted her comments on the IRA. Abbott replied that "[i]t was 34 years ago and I've moved on".

Charging fees for speeches to students
In 2017, Abbott was criticised after it emerged that in 2011, she charged the University of Birmingham £1,750 for a 50-minute speech. An online petition called on Abbott to repay the money to be used for educational purposes.

Appearance alongside Chinese human rights abuse denier
In November 2020, Abbott apologised for appearing on a livestream with Li Jingjing, a journalist who works for the Chinese state-owned CGTN, who denied human rights abuses against the Uyghurs and suggested they were a "fiction" cooked up to try and start a "racial war". Abbott failed to challenge these remarks.

Sasha Johnson comments
Following the shooting of Sasha Johnson on 23 May 2021, Abbott tweeted:

Black activist #SashaJohnson in hospital in critical condition after sustaining a gunshot wound to the head. Nobody should have to potentially pay with their life because they stood up for racial justice.

The tweet was criticised by a Home Office source who accused Abbott of departing from the facts and for stoking racial tensions after suggesting that the shooting was a racially motivated attack and targeted because of Johnson's activism. Abbott denies the claim the tweet inflamed racial divides.

Russian invasion of Ukraine
On 24 February 2022, following the 2022 Russian invasion of Ukraine, Abbott was one of 11 Labour MPs threatened with losing the party whip after they signed a statement by the Stop the War Coalition that questioned the legitimacy of NATO and accused the military alliance of "eastward expansion". All 11 MPs subsequently removed their signatures.

Online abuse

In a Guardian article in February 2017, Abbott wrote about receiving racist and sexist abuse online every day, such as threats of rape. A few days later, in an interview with Sophy Ridge on Sky News, Abbott proposed a parliamentary inquiry into the sexist and racist abuse of MPs in social media and the way Twitter and Facebook investigate cases that arise. An Amnesty International report found that Abbott was the subject of almost half of all abusive tweets about female MPs on Twitter during the 2017 election campaign, receiving ten times more abuse than any other MP.

Personal life
Abbott had a brief relationship with Jeremy Corbyn, who later became the Labour leader, when he was a councillor in north London in the late 1970s. In 1991, she married David P. Ayensu-Thompson, a Ghanaian architect. They had one son together, James (born October 1991 or 1992), before divorcing in 1993. Abbott chose her Conservative MP voting pair, Jonathan Aitken, as her son's godfather.

In 2007, Abbott began learning the piano under the tutelage of Paul Roberts, Professor of Piano at the Guildhall School of Music and Drama, for the BBC documentary TV programme Play It Again. She performed Frédéric Chopin's Prelude No. 4 in E minor before an audience.

In 2015, Abbott was diagnosed with type 2 diabetes.

In July 2019, Abbott called 999 after being "chased around her home" by her son, James Abbott-Thompson. In relation to this incident, as well as subsequent incidents away from Abbott's home, Abbott-Thompson later pleaded guilty to 12 assaults and racially aggravated criminal damage.

In September 2020, an authorised biography of Diane Abbott was released, Diane Abbott: The Authorised Biography, by Robin Bunce and Samara Linton, published by Biteback. In 2020, Abbott was invited to participate in Strictly Come Dancing. Speaking on BBC Radio Four's Today Programme, she said that she refused the invitation, pausing only "for about sixty seconds". Instead, she said that she will continue to do what she has done all of her life, speaking up on human rights, civil liberties, women's rights, and representing the people of Hackney.

Written works

Notes

References

External links

 Diane Abbott MP. Official constituency website
 Diane Abbott – The first black woman to be elected to the House of Commons".
 

|-

|-

|-

|-

1953 births
Living people
20th-century British women politicians
21st-century British women politicians
Alumni of Newnham College, Cambridge
BBC people
Black British MPs
Black British women politicians
British political commentators
British socialist feminists
Councillors in the City of Westminster
English feminists
English people of Jamaican descent
English socialists
European democratic socialists
Female members of the Parliament of the United Kingdom for English constituencies
Hackney Members of Parliament
Labour Party (UK) councillors
Labour Party (UK) MPs for English constituencies
Left-wing politics in the United Kingdom
Members of the Privy Council of the United Kingdom
People from Paddington
Shadow Secretaries of State for Health
UK MPs 1987–1992
UK MPs 1992–1997
UK MPs 1997–2001
UK MPs 2001–2005
UK MPs 2005–2010
UK MPs 2010–2015
UK MPs 2015–2017
UK MPs 2017–2019
UK MPs 2019–present
Women councillors in England